Cumberland, MD-WV MSA, or Cumberland Metro for short, is the Metropolitan Statistical Area of Cumberland, Maryland and the surrounding economic region of Allegany County, Maryland and Mineral County, West Virginia, in the United States.

A Metropolitan Statistical Area represents a regional economy of closely tied cities, towns, and surrounding rural areas with a high degree of social, geographic, and economic integration; and a total combined regional population of 50,000 or more.  Metro Statistical Areas are named after the primary city and states within the area.

As of 2000, The City of Cumberland had a population of 21,591 and the surrounding area had a population of 102,008.  Allegany and Mineral are mountainous, mostly rural areas. According to the 2000 census, more than 45 percent of the people living in the Cumberland region live in rural and non-incorporated areas.

The Cumberland Metropolitan Area is geographically isolated by a range of ridges and valleys from the rest of Maryland which is relatively flat. These mountain ranges form adjacent valleys which have served to collect and integrate the regional cities and towns together into urbanized channels that follow the valleys northeasterly.  This has served to give the area a unique sense of identity and economic integration.

The median household income for the MSA was $30,916 and the average household income was $39,021.  The Cumberland, MD-WV Metropolitan Statistical Area is one of the poorest in the United States, ranking 305th out of 318 metropolitan areas in per capita income.

GDP by year 
Total GDP of Cumberland, MD-WV MSA

Most populous places within the metro

 Cumberland, Maryland 21,591
 Frostburg, Maryland 7,529 
 Cresaptown-Bel Air, Maryland 5,900
 Keyser, West Virginia 5,132
 La Vale, Maryland 4,658

Cities and towns within the metro

  Cumberland, MD
  Ridgeley, WV
  La Vale, MD
  Carpendele, WV
  Wiley Ford, WV
  Evitts Creek
  Bowling Green and Robert's Place
  Corriganville, MD
  Cresaptown, MD
  Bel Air, MD
  Ellerslie, MD
  Potomac Park, MD
  Spring Gap, MD
  Rocket Center, WV
  Pinto, MD
  Eckhart Mines, MD
  Mount Savage, MD
  Rawlings, MD
  Frostburg, MD
  Midlothian, MD
  Fort Ashby, WV
  Flintstone, MD
  Oldtown, MD
  Midland, MD
  Lonaconing, MD
  Barton, MD
  McCoole, MD
  Keyser, WV
  Westernport, MD
  Piedmont, WV
  Luke, MD

Metro corridors

 Georges Creek Valley (Maryland Route 36)
 Interstate 68
 U.S. Route 40
 U.S. Route 220

Regional businesses and employers 

Significant area employers include:

 Western Maryland Health System, which employs approximately 2,300 people, making it Cumberland's largest employer.
 Allegany Ballistics Laboratory/Northrop Grumman (approximately 1,000 people) a diverse state-of-the-art industrial complex located in Rocket Center, West Virginia.  About 80 military products are made here.  Also on the site is the Robert C. Byrd Hilltop Office Complex and the Robert C. Byrd Institute for Advanced Flexible Manufacturing.
 Allegany County government.
 Allegany College of Maryland employs approximately 800 people.
 Xerox Contact Center, which employs about 500 people.
 City of Cumberland employing approximately 300 people.
 CBIZ Accounting, Tax & Advisory of Maryland a full service CPA firm providing services to commercial and individual clients throughout the tri-states of Maryland, West Virginia and Pennsylvania.
 Hunter Douglas: a  facility, with 580 plus employees, makes the company the largest Hunter Douglas fabrication plant in the world. The company is Allegany County's sixth largest employer.
 American Woodmark, facilities located in the newly developed Barton Business Park, assembles wood cabinet components received from other AWC plants and ships completed cabinets to customers located in the Northeast and Midwest regions of the United States. (Approximately 500 people employed)
 Western Correctional Institution State Prison, employs 550 people; a number of other people are employed at the Federal Prison and the new Maximum Security Prison all in close proximity to Cumberland

See also

 Highest-income metropolitan statistical areas in the United States

References 

 
Cumberland, Maryland
Allegany County, Maryland
Mineral County, West Virginia
Metropolitan areas of Maryland
Metropolitan areas of West Virginia